A referendum was held in Switzerland on 13 February 2011 on the federal popular initiative "For the protection against gun violence". It was rejected by 56% of voters and a majority of cantons.

Initiative
The initiative foresees that military guns can no longer be kept at home, but must be stored at the arsenal (Zeughaus) instead, that possession of a gun should be linked to a screening of the ability and necessity of the gunholder, and that all guns should be registered. Left-wing parties (SP, Greens, CSP) and the GLP are mostly in favour of the proposal, with right-wing parties (SVP, FDP, CVP, BDP) opposed.

Text of law as proposed

Opinion polls
According to polls from January 2011, the initiative was favoured by 45% of respondents, with 34% opposed and a relatively high amount of undecideds at 21%. A second poll from two weeks before the referendum saw a closening of the polls, with 47% to 45% in favour.

Results
More than half, 56.3%, of all voters were against the initiative, with only the cantons of Basel-Stadt, Zurich, Geneva, Jura, Vaud and Neuchâtel in support; this meant the initiative would have narrowly passed in western Switzerland, but clearly failed in the German-speaking parts. In Switzerland, the passing of a constitutional amendment by initiative requires a double majority; not only must a majority of people vote for the amendment but also a majority of cantons give their consent.

See also
Gun politics in Switzerland

External links
Official website

References

Referendum, February
2011 referendums
Referendums in Switzerland
for the protection against gun violence
Gun politics